Mason Proffit was an American country rock band from Indianapolis, Indiana, that released five albums between 1969 and 1973. They are known for their song "Two Hangmen", which garnered a significant amount of Album Oriented Rock airplay.

History

Brothers Terry Talbot and John Michael Talbot played together in several local bands around Indianapolis, Indiana and later in Chicago.  After their group Sounds Unlimited disbanded, in 1969 they formed Mason Proffit with a focus on the emerging blend of folk, country and rock that would come to be called country rock.

"Two Hangmen", written by the older brother, Terry, and released on their first album, Wanted, became a regional hit. This helped their second album, Movin' Toward Happiness, chart on the Billboard 200. Wanted was nominated for Best Album Cover for the 1971 Grammy Awards mistakenly as being entitled Mason Proffit. In 1972, the band signed to Warner Bros. Records and continued touring, performing up to 300 concerts each year. Some of Mason Proffit's opening acts during that time included The Doobie Brothers, Steely Dan, John Denver, and Mac Davis. Their country-rock-bluegrass style was innovative yet difficult to place in a marketing genre. Their live shows were high-energy. And once, while jamming with The Scruggs Review, John Hartford and the Nitty Gritty Dirt Band, Earl Scruggs called John Talbot "the best banjo player I've ever heard." The Talbot brothers opened for the Eagles on a national tour.

In June of 1973 Mason Profitt opened for a little known, outside New England, band by the name of Aerosmith at Canobie Lake Park, an amusement park in Salem, NH. The occasion was an event known as WRKO Night, a night of free rides and a concert sponsored by the Boston radio station WRKO.

Warner Bros. re-released their first two albums as a compilation, Come & Gone which garnered a Grammy for best album package in 1974. It also released Rockfish Crossing and Bareback Rider. Mason Proffit disbanded when brothers John and Terry Talbot left the band and began performing as a duo. Warners then released The Talbot Bros., the first of three duo albums with the remaining two released on Sparrow Records. Sparrow eventually re-issued the first Talbot Bros. album, minus the track "Moline Truckin". After the break-up, the Talbot brothers began to record contemporary Christian music on Sparrow Records, earning themselves a Grammy Award nomination and several Dove Award nominations.

Discography
{| class="wikitable"
| align="center" style="background:#f0f0f0;"|Year
| align="center" style="background:#f0f0f0;"|Title
| align="center" style="background:#f0f0f0;"|Chart Position
| align="center" style="background:#f0f0f0;"|Label
| align="center" style="background:#f0f0f0;"|Number
|-
|align="center"|1969||Wanted||||align="center" rowspan="2"|Happy Tiger||align="center"|1009
|-
|align="center" rowspan="2"|1971||Movin' Toward Happiness||align="center"|177||align="center"|1019
|-
||Last Night I Had the Strangest Dream||align="center"|186||align="center"|Ampex||align="center"|A-10138
|- 
|align="center"|1972||Rockfish Crossing||align="center"|211||align="center" rowspan="3"|Warner Bros.||align="center"|BS-2657
|-
|align="center"|1973||Bare Back Rider||align="center"|198||align="center"|BS-2704
|-
|align="center"|1973||Come & Gone * ||align="center"|203||align="center"|2S-2746
|-
|align="center"|2005||Still Hangin'''||||align="center"|Mason Proffit||
|}
* double album reissue of Wanted and Movin' Toward Happiness''

References

American folk rock groups
American country rock groups